There have been two different races in racing history called the True Value 500:

One held at Pocono Raceway for USAC Champ Cars in 1980, for which see Pocono 500 (Indycar)
Two held at Texas Motor Speedway for Indy Racing League cars in 1997 and 1998, for which see Firestone 550